Michael Bowron QPM is a retired British police officer. From 2011 to July 2017 he was Chief Officer of States of Jersey Police. He was previously the Commissioner of the City of London Police from 2006 to 2011.

Early life
Bowron was educated at Sussex University, where he achieved a Bachelor of Arts (BA) in Sociology.

Career
Bowron worked as a broker for Lloyd's of London before joining Sussex Police in 1980.

In 2006, he was appointed Commissioner of the City of London Police. He graduated from the FBI Academy in 2007. In 2010, Bowron played a key role in setting up the National Fraud Intelligence Bureau.

On 4 January 2011, he transferred to the States of Jersey Police to become its Chief Officer.

Honours

References

Living people
Commissioners of the City of London Police
English recipients of the Queen's Police Medal
States of Jersey Police officers
People educated at Ernest Bevin College
Alumni of the University of Sussex
Year of birth missing (living people)